The Men's Scratch was one of the 10 men's events contested at the 2007 UCI Track World Championship, held in Palma de Mallorca, Spain.

27 Cyclists from 27 countries participated in the scratch race. After the 2 qualifying heats, the best 11 of each heat advanced to the Final.

The qualifying heats began at 15:10 and the Final was run at 21:05 on March 30.

Qualification
The qualifying competition consisted of 30 laps, making a total of 7.5 km.

Heat 1

Heat 2

Final
The Final competition consisted of 60 laps, making a total of 15 km. The champion Kam-Po Wong overtook the lead pack when there were 9 laps remaining and he crossed the finishing line at roughly 17 minutes 43 seconds.

References

Men's scratch
UCI Track Cycling World Championships – Men's scratch